In telecommunication, a ternary signal is a signal that can assume, at any given instant, one of three states or significant conditions, such as power level, phase position, pulse duration, or frequency.

Examples of ternary signals are (a) a pulse that can have a positive, zero, or negative voltage value at any given instant (PAM-3), (b) a sine wave that can assume phases of 0°, 120°, or 240° relative to a clock pulse (3-PSK), and (c) a carrier signal that can assume any one of three different frequencies depending on three different modulation signal significant conditions (3-FM).

Some examples of PAM-3 line codes that use ternary signals are:
 hybrid ternary code
 bipolar encoding
 MLT-3 encoding used in 100BASE-TX Ethernet
 B3ZS
 4B3T used in some ISDN basic rate interface
 8B6T used in 100BASE-T4 Ethernet
 return-to-zero
 SOQPSK-TG uses ternary continuous phase modulation

3-PSK can be seen as falling between "binary phase-shift keying" (BPSK), which uses two phases, and "quadrature phase-shift keying" (QPSK), which uses four phases.

References

See also
 Balanced ternary
 Digital signal (electronics)
 Fast Ethernet#100BASE-T2 uses PAM-5, which, like ternary, is one of the few modulation schemes that does not use a power-of-two number of symbols.
 Ternary computer
 Three-phase electric power, like 3-PSK, uses 3 phases at a single frequency and amplitude.
 Three-valued logic

Line codes
Ternary computers